Route 121 is a numbered state highway running  in Rhode Island and  in Massachusetts. It is part of the route connecting the city of Woonsocket (via Route 114) with the town of Wrentham.

Route description

In Rhode Island, Route 121 exists entirely in a rural section of Cumberland. In Massachusetts, it is known as Cumberland Road and West Street.

History
The route from Woonsocket to Wrentham was assigned as Route 142 in the early 1920s when the New England states began numbering their state highways. It used present-day Route 114 from Route 122 in Woonsocket and Cumberland, then along present-day Route 121 to Wrentham.

Around 1933, the entire route (in both Rhode Island and Massachusetts) was renumbered as Route 11 and its northern end extended into Dedham along old Route 1 (current Route 1A) when Route 1 was realigned. Route 11 was later cut back to its original length after a few years when Route 1A was designated in the area.

This was due to the westward extension of the Route 114 designation into the city of Woonsocket. At the same time, the route was renumbered to Route 121.

Major intersections

References

External links

2019 Highway Map, Rhode Island

Cumberland, Rhode Island
121
121
Transportation in Norfolk County, Massachusetts
Transportation in Providence County, Rhode Island